The Bulgarian Basketball Cup is an annual cup competition, organized by the Bulgarian Basketball Federation since 1951. The cup was not held in 1957, 1958, 1960 and 1961. BC CSKA Sofia is the all-time record holder with 17 titles.

Format
Since 2009, except from 2017-2019, the Final Eight format has been used and from 2010 only teams from the first tier participate in it. The eight teams play a play-off at one venue, over four days, eventually producing a winner. From 2017 to 2019, the quarterfinals and semifinals are played in a double-legged format, while the final was played in one game on a neutral venue. The top six teams, from NBL, have an automatic bye to quarterfinals, while the other three and five teams from A Group League (second tier) play preliminary rounds for a place in the quarterfinals.

Title holders

 1951 Spartak Sofia
 1952 Academic Sofia
 1953 CDNA
 1954 Academic Sofia
 1955 CDNA
 1956 Transport High School
 1957 Not held 
 1958 Not held 
 1959 Slavia Sofia
 1960 Not held 
 1961 Not held 
 1962 CDNA
 1963 CDNA 
 1964 VIF
 1965 Botev Burgas
 1966 Lokomotiv Sofia
 1967 Spartak Sofia
 1968 Spartak Sofia
 1969 Levski-Spartak
 1970 Balkan Botevgrad
 1971 Levski-Spartak
 1972 Levski-Spartak
 1973 CSKA
 1974 CSKA
 1975 Chernomorets 
 1976 Levski-Spartak
 1977 CSKA 
 1978 CSKA 
 1979 Levski-Spartak
 1980 Levski-Spartak
 1981 CSKA 
 1982 Levski-Spartak
 1983 Levski-Spartak
 1984 CSKA
 1985 CSKA 
 1986 Balkan Botevgrad
 1987 Balkan Botevgrad
 1988 Balkan Botevgrad
 1989 CSKA 
 1990 CSKA 
 1991 CSKA 
 1992 CSKA 
 1993 Levski Totel
 1994 CSKA 
 1995 Kompact Dimitrovgrad 
 1996 Plama Pleven
 1997 Slavia Sofia
 1998 Cherno More Sodi
 1999 Cherno More
 2000 Cherno More
 2001 Levski
 2002 Lukoil Academic
 2003 Lukoil Academic
 2004 Lukoil Academic
 2005 CSKA 
 2006 Lukoil Academic 
 2007 Lukoil Academic 
 2008 Lukoil Academic
 2009 Levski
 2010 Levski
 2011 Lukoil Academic 
 2012 Lukoil Academic 
 2013 Lukoil Academic
 2014 Levski
 2015 Cherno More Port Varna
 2016 Rilski Sportist
 2017 Beroe
 2018 Rilski Sportist
 2019 Levski
 2020 Levski
 2021 Rilski Sportist
 2022 Rilski Sportist

Recent finals

Titles by team

References

 
Basketball competitions in Bulgaria
Recurring sporting events established in 1951
1951 establishments in Bulgaria